The black-eared squirrel (Nannosciurus melanotis) is a species of rodent in the family Sciuridae. It is monotypic within the genus Nannosciurus. This tiny squirrel is found in forests in Borneo, Sumatra and Java. Except for its striking whitish and black facial markings, the black-eared squirrel resembles the least pygmy squirrel.

References

Mammals described in 1840
Mammals of Borneo
Mammals of Brunei
Rodents of Indonesia
Rodents of Malaysia
Callosciurinae
Taxonomy articles created by Polbot